The Kentucky Derby Open was a PGA Tour event in Kentucky that was played at Seneca Golf Course in Louisville in the   won his first PGA Tour event at this tournament in  Seneca is a municipal course, located just northwest of

Winners

References

External links
Louisville Parks and Recreation – Seneca Golf Course

Former PGA Tour events
Golf in Kentucky
Sports competitions in Louisville, Kentucky
Recurring sporting events established in 1957
Recurring sporting events disestablished in 1959
1957 establishments in Kentucky
1959 disestablishments in Kentucky